The Burgundian party was a political allegiance against France that formed during the latter half of the Hundred Years' War. The term "Burgundians" refers to the supporters of the Duke of Burgundy, John the Fearless, that formed after the assassination of Louis I, Duke of Orléans. Their opposition to the Armagnac party, the supporters of Charles, Duke of Orléans, led to a civil war in the early 15th century, itself part of the larger Hundred Years' War.

Geography
The Duke of Burgundy had inherited a large number of lands scattered from what is now the border of Switzerland up to the North Sea. The Duchy of Burgundy had been granted as an appanage to Philip the Bold in the 14th century, and this was followed by other territories inherited by Philip and his heirs during the late 14th and 15th centuries, including the County of Burgundy (the Franche-Comté), Flanders, Artois and many other domains in what are now Belgium, Luxembourg, the Netherlands and northeastern France.  Prosperous textile manufacture in the Low Countries made this among the wealthiest realms in Europe, and explained their desire to maintain trade with wool-producing England.

Politics 

Partisan use of the term "Burgundian" arose from a feud between John II, Duke of Burgundy and Louis of Valois, Duke of Orléans.  The latter was the brother of King Charles VI, the former was his cousin.  When Charles VI’s mental illness interrupted his ability to rule, John II and Louis I vied for power in a bitter dispute.  Popular rumor attributed an adulterous affair to the Duke of Orléans and French queen Isabeau of Bavaria.  Supporters of the two dukes became known as "Burgundians" and "Orleanists", respectively.

Other than in Burgundy's own lands, the Duke's supporters were particularly powerful in Paris, where the butchers' guild, notably, closely supported him.

The partisan terms outlasted the lives of these two men.  John, Duke of Burgundy ordered the assassination of Louis of Orléans in 1407.  Burgundian partisans at the University of Paris published a treatise justifying this as tyrannicide in the belief that the Duke of Orléans had been plotting to kill the king and usurp the throne.  Leadership of his party passed nominally to his son, Charles, but in fact to the young duke's father-in-law, Bernard VII, Count of Armagnac. Bernard VII would form a league in opposition to the Burgundians in Gien, the Armagnac party. Both parties sought the support of the Kingdom of England. The Armagnacs through treaty with the English King Henry IV, to secure his military aid; the Burgundians by remaining neutral when the English invaded Normandy. That neutrality led to Orléans's capture by the English at Agincourt in 1415. After Armagnac's murder by a Burgundian mob in Paris in 1418, leadership of the party devolved upon the young Dauphin, who retreated to Bourges.

After 1418, then, Burgundy controlled both Paris and the person of the king. However, the whole dispute was proving deleterious to the war effort against the English, as both sides focused more on fighting one another than on preventing the English from conquering Normandy.  In 1419, the Duke and the Dauphin negotiated a truce to allow both sides to focus on fighting the English.  However, in a further parley, the Duke was murdered by the Dauphin's supporters as revenge for the murder of Orléans twelve years before.

Burgundian party leadership passed to Philip III, Duke of Burgundy.  Duke Philip entered an alliance with England.  Due to his influence and that of the queen, Isabeau, who had by now joined the Burgundian party, the mad king was induced to sign the Treaty of Troyes with England in 1420, by which Charles VI recognized Henry V of England as his heir, disinheriting his own son the Dauphin.

When Henry V and Charles VI both died within months of each other, leaving Henry's son Henry VI of England as heir to both England and France, Philip the Good and the Burgundians continued to support the English.  Nevertheless, dissension grew between Philip and the English regent, John, Duke of Bedford.  Although family ties between Burgundy and Bedford (who had married the Duke's sister) prevented an outright rupture during Bedford's lifetime.  Burgundy gradually withdrew support for the English and began to seek an understanding with the Dauphin, by now Charles VII of France.  The two sides finally reconciled at the Congress of Arras in 1435, resulting in a treaty which allowed the French king to finally return to his capital.

Notable Burgundians
 John the Fearless, Duke of Burgundy
 Philip the Good, Duke of Burgundy
 Jean Petit, Theologian at the University of Paris
 Claude de Beauvoir, Marshal of France
 Nicolas Rolin, Chancellor of Burgundy
 Simon Caboche, prominent member of the Parisian butcher's guild
 Pierre Cauchon, Bishop of Beauvais

See also
 Joan of Arc
 Duke of Burgundy
 History of France
 Arthur III, Duke of Brittany (Arthur de Richemont)
 Burgundians
 Armagnac–Burgundian Civil War

 

oc:Bourguignons